CBY, or cby, may refer to the following:

 Burnelli CBY-3, a transport aircraft built in Canada in 1944
 CBY, the IATA code for Canobie Airport in the state of Queensland, Australia
 cby, the ISO 639-3 code for the Carabayo language spoken in the Amazonian region of Colombia
 CBY, the National Rail code for Charlbury railway station in the county of Oxfordshire, UK
 CBY (radio station), a radio station broadcasting from Corner Brook, Newfoundland and Labrador, Canada
 CBY1, a gene that encodes for the protein chibby homolog 1

See also